The Czech Republic men's national junior ice hockey team is the national under-20 ice hockey team in the Czech Republic. The team represents the Czech Republic at the International Ice Hockey Federation's IIHF World U20 Championship.

Past World Championship Results

Ice hockey Men Junior
Junior national ice hockey teams
Youth ice hockey in the Czech Republic